Malik Miles Golden (born April 27, 1993) is a former American football safety. He played college football at Penn State.

Professional career

San Francisco 49ers
Golden signed with the San Francisco 49ers as an undrafted free agent on May 4, 2017. He was waived by the 49ers on June 9, 2017.

Pittsburgh Steelers
On July 28, 2017, Golden signed with the Pittsburgh Steelers. He was waived/injured by the Steelers on September 2, 2017 with a groin injury and was placed on injured reserve. He was released with an injury settlement on September 12, 2017. He re-signed with the Steelers on January 19, 2018.

On September 1, 2018, Golden was waived/injured by the Steelers and was placed on injured reserve.

References

1993 births
Living people
American football safeties
Penn State Nittany Lions football players
Pittsburgh Steelers players
Players of American football from Hartford, Connecticut
San Francisco 49ers players
Cheshire Academy alumni